Troubadour is the sixth and final album by American musician Robert Hazard, released on October 9, 2007 by Rykodisc.

Track listing

Personnel 
Musicians

 Robert Hazard – lead vocals, acoustic guitar
 Pete Heitzman – electric guitar (all tracks except 11), slide guitar (4, 6, 9, 10), acoustic guitar (6, 7, 10), baritone guitar (3), organ (1, 10), mandolin (6), volume pedal (2), backing vocals (4)
 Karen Savoca – percussion (1, 4, 6), backing vocals (2, 4, 6), clavinet (9), tambourine (10)
 T-Bone Wolk – acoustic and electric bass guitar, organ (2, 4, 11), piano (4, 10), accordion (6, 11)
 Nick Langan – harmonica (1, 4)
 Derek Jordan – fiddle (6, 11)
 Eric Andersen – harmonica (8), backing vocals (8)
 Steve Holley – drums, percussion

Technical

 Chris Andersen, Billy Shaw, Alan Stockwell – engineers
 Pete Heitzman, Karen Savoca – mixing
 Jamie Hoyt-Vitale – art direction, design
 Peter Moshay – mastering
 Michael Tearson – liner notes
 Frank Veronsky – photography

References 

2007 albums
Rykodisc albums